Acid grassland is a nutrient-poor habitat characterised by grassy tussocks and bare ground.

Habitat

The vegetation is dominated by grasses and herbaceous plants, growing on soils deficient in lime (calcium). These may be found on acid sedimentary rock such as sandstone; acid igneous rock such as granite; and fluvial or glacial deposits such as sand and gravel. Typical plants of lowland acid grassland in Britain include common bent grass, Agrostis capillaris, wavy hair-grass, Deschampsia flexuosa, bristle bent grass, Agrostis curtisii, tormentil, Potentilla erecta, and flowers such as sheep's sorrel, Rumex acetosella and heath bedstraw, Galium saxatile.

In Britain

In Britain, under 30,000 hectares of lowland acid grassland remain, often on common land and nature reserves. It is considered a nationally important habitat; areas are found in London on freely-draining sandy and gravelly soils. 271 Sites of Special Scientific Interest have been notified with acid grassland as a principal reason for the designation. Greater London's Richmond Park, Epping Forest and Wimbledon Common are all Special Areas of Conservation with considerable areas of acid grassland.

References

Ecosystems
Grasslands